Miss Cullen's Almshouses in Carrington, Nottingham is a complex of 12 almshouses erected in 1882-83. They are also known as the Cullen Memorial Homes.

The architects were Evans and Jolley. The work was supervised by William Roberts of Acacia House, Beeston, with the practical part in the hands of Mr. Ball. The sub-contractors for stone work were Mr. Bishop of Nottingham and for plastering Messrs. Clarke Bros., of Nottingham. They were paid for by Miss Elizabeth Cullen and Miss Marianne Cullen of Park Valley, Nottingham, in memory of their brother James Cullen, who died in 1878. The endowment provided the occupants with an income of 4s. 6d. a month.

The almshouses are maintained by the Miss Cullen's Almshouses Charity (217572).

References

Almshouses in Nottingham
Buildings and structures in Nottingham
Residential buildings completed in 1883